Pantanodon sp. nov. 'Manombo' is a species of fish in the family Poeciliidae. It is endemic to Madagascar.  Its natural habitats are rivers and swamps. It is critically endangered and threatened by habitat loss.

References

Sources
 Loiselle, P. & participants of the CBSG/ANGAP CAMP "Faune de Madagascar" workshop 2004.

Manombo
Fish of Madagascar
Endemic fauna of Madagascar
Undescribed vertebrate species
Taxonomy articles created by Polbot
Taxobox binomials not recognized by IUCN